In mathematics differential geometry, an antifundamental representation of a Lie group is the complex conjugate of the fundamental representation, although the distinction between the fundamental and the antifundamental representation is a matter of convention. However, these two are often non-equivalent, because each of them is a complex representation.

References

Representation theory of Lie groups